Intercity Shopping Centre is a shopping mall in Thunder Bay, Ontario, Canada.

In the 1990s, the entire Intercity site was redesigned. The strip mall was demolished and a more modern mall was constructed with Sears and Zellers serving as anchor tenants until January 2013, when Zellers closed permanently. Renovations to this part of the mall began immediately, and a new Target store opened in summer of 2013. It closed in April 2015. In August 2016, Lowe's had renovated this spot in the mall and was one of the mall's anchor tenants until it closed in January 2020.

References

External links

Buildings and structures in Thunder Bay
Shopping malls in Ontario
Shopping malls established in 1982
Tourist attractions in Thunder Bay District